Myristica dactyloides is a species of plant in the family Myristicaceae. It is endemic to Sri Lanka. The species was earlier thought to occur in India because two subspecies of the related Myristica beddomei found in India, namely M. b. beddomei and M. b. ustulata, were wrongly identified as M. dactyloides Gaertn. in many herbarium specimens and regional floras.  

Taxonomy 

Myristica dactyloides differs from the Indian taxon M. beddomei in leaf and flower characteristics. The former has broadly lanceolate to broadly elliptic leaves with obtuse base, being brownish with indistinct veins on the underside. The male flowers have caducous bracteoles and the male flower buds are distinctly ellipsoid with pointed apex. Some sources have it as a synonym of Myristica malabarica.

References

dactyloides
Conservation dependent plants
Endemic flora of Sri Lanka
Taxonomy articles created by Polbot